National Route 310 is a national highway of Japan connecting Sakai-ku, Sakai and Gojō, Nara, with a total length of 39.3 km (24.42 mi).

References

National highways in Japan
Roads in Nara Prefecture
Roads in Osaka Prefecture